Personal Appearance Theater is an American half-hour television anthology series that featured a combination of comedy and mystery films. A total of 29 episodes aired on ABC from October 27, 1951 to May 23, 1952.

Among its guest stars were Nina Bara, Marjorie Reynolds, Buddy Ebsen, Joseph Schildkraut, Anita Louise, Jane Darwell, and Dub Taylor.

References

External links
Personal Appearance Theater at CVTA with episode list

1950s American anthology television series
1951 American television series debuts
1951 American television series endings
American Broadcasting Company original programming